Camponotus maculatus is a species of carpenter ant (genus Camponotus).

Subspecies
Camponotus maculatus foveolatus Stitz, 1925 - Philippines
Camponotus maculatus maculatus Fabricius, 1782 - Angola, Benin, Cameroon, Central African Republic, Chad, Comoros, Eritrea, Gambia, Guinea, Ivory Coast, Kenya, Lesotho, Liberia, Mozambique, Namibia, Senegal, Sierra Leone, South Africa, Sudan, São Tomé & Principe, Tanzania, Uganda, Zimbabwe, Micronesia, Palau, Madagascar, Mauritius, Trinidad and Tobago, Algeria, Ethiopia, Iran, Oman.
Camponotus maculatus obfuscatus Viehmeyer, 1916 - Singapore
Camponotus maculatus subnudus Emery, 1889 - Myanmar, Philippines 
Camponotus maculatus sylvaticomaculatus Dalla Torre, 1893 - Turkey
Camponotus maculatus ugandensis Santschi, 1923 - Uganda

References

External links

 at antwiki.org
Itis.gov
Animaldiversity.org

maculatus
Hymenoptera of Asia
Insects described in 1782